The Sutton Coldfield train crash took place at about 16:13 on 23 January 1955 in Sutton Coldfield, Warwickshire (now within Birmingham), when an express passenger train traveling from York to Bristol, derailed due to excessive speed on a sharp curve.

Accident circumstances 
Headed by a LMS Black Five steam locomotive No 45274, the 12:15 York to Bristol express, consisting of ten carriages, approached Sutton Coldfield railway station at about 55-60 mph (88-96 km/h) — twice the permitted speed of 30 mph.  When it reached the sharp curve immediately before the station, the train derailed, colliding with the platforms.

The carriages, engine, and station buildings were severely damaged.  The first carriage was crushed between the engine and the second carriage.  The fourth carriage was knocked into the air causing it to drag along the station roof, damaging both the roof and the platforms to either side.  Seventeen people, including the train crew, were killed and 25 injured.

The train had been diverted away from its usual route into Birmingham via  Tamworth because of engineering work.  The regular driver did not know the diversionary route via Sutton Coldfield, so another driver, fully conversant with it, had joined him at Burton-on-Trent to 'conduct' him over this section. However, the regular driver, complaining that the rough riding of the engine was tiring him, left the footplate and took a seat in the train, leaving the temporary driver in charge. This action was later criticised by the Inspecting Officer who commented that, even though he did not know the route, the safety of the train was still his responsibility.

Emergency response
The number of casualties was prevented from rising as a result of the actions of two local people who rushed up the railway line to stop a train heading towards the crash site. Two railway employees also raised the alarm to other stations, changed the signals to danger and placed detonators on the tracks to warn oncoming trains. One of the two had been injured and shocked by the accident, and both were rewarded with gold watches for their work.

The scene was attended to by a mobile surgical unit from Birmingham Accident Hospital as well as 40 additional ambulances from surrounding districts. Royal Air Force servicemen from Whitehouse Common provided aid to the emergency services.

Possible causes
Although the excessive speed was the major factor in the accident, the exact cause was never fully established. The accident occurred in broad daylight and the driver knew the line well.  There was no evidence of mechanical failure on the train.  The driver and fireman died in the locomotive, so the reason for the excessive speed was never established.  Investigators identified several factors that could have contributed to the excessive speed:
The train was running late and making up time.
There was a gradient to climb after the station which was best approached at full speed.
The steam locomotive (like most at the time) was not fitted with a speedometer.
The engine was riding roughly, which may have contributed to the driver's misjudging the speed.

Consequences 

Following this accident, lineside speed restriction signs were universally adopted; previously there had been no visual reminder to the driver of speed restrictions on many routes.  The Inspector also suggested the use of speed recorders, as in France, but this was not adopted.

On 23 January 2016, the 61st anniversary of the crash, a memorial to the victims was unveiled, at Sutton Coldfield station, by the Lord Mayor of Birmingham, Councillor Ray Hassall.

Similar accidents 
  Salisbury rail crash - 1906 - Overspeed through sharp curve through station. 28 killed.
  Morpeth rail crashes - 1969 etc.  - Overspeed through sharp curve.
  Waterfall rail accident - 2003 - overspeed through sharp curve - 7 killed
  Amagasaki rail crash - 2005 - Overspeed through sharp curve. 107 killed, 562 injured
  Santiago de Compostela rail disaster - 2013 - Overspeed through sharp curve - 79 killed, 139 injured.

See also
 List of rail accidents in the United Kingdom

References

External links 
 BBC Page on January  1955 accident
 The Railways Archive: Accident at Sutton Coldfield

Railway accidents and incidents in the West Midlands (county)
Railway accidents in 1955
1955 disasters in the United Kingdom
1955 in England
20th century in Warwickshire
Sutton Coldfield
Disasters in Warwickshire
Derailments in England
Accidents and incidents involving British Rail
January 1955 events in the United Kingdom
Rail accidents caused by a driver's error